Hermeuptychia hermybius is a butterfly of the family Nymphalidae. It has been recorded in southern North America from the lower Rio Grande Valley region of Texas, along the Rio Grande from Laredo to the Gulf coast. It is also found in neighbouring Mexico (Tamaulipas, San Luis Potosí).

The length of the forewings is 16 mm.

The larvae feed on Panicum maximus.

Etymology
The species name refers to a fusion of the two words herm[es] beginning and [sos]ybius referring to Hermeuptychia hermes and Hermeuptychia sosybius.

Life history

References

Butterflies described in 2014
Euptychiina